Suryakant is a given name. Notable people with the name include:

Suryakant Acharya, Indian politician
Suryakant Dhasmana, Indian politician
Suryakant Lonkar, Indian politician
Suryakant Mandhare, Indian actor
Suryakant Pradhan, Indian cricketer
Suryakant Tripathi 'Nirala', Indian singer